Laophontidae is a family of copepods belonging to the order Harpacticoida.

Genera

The family contains the following genera:

Aequinoctiella 
Afrolaophonte 
Amerolaophontina 
Apistophonte 
Applanola 
Archesola 
Archilaophonte 
Arenolaophonte 
Asellopsis 
Bathyesola 
Bathylaophonte 
Carcinocaris 
Carraroenia 
Chilaophonte 
Corbulaseta 
Cornylaophonte 
Coullia 
Echinolaophonte 
Elapholaophonte 
Esola 
Fiersiphontina 
Folioquinpes 
Galapalaophonte 
Harrietella 
Hemilaophonte 
Heterolaophonte 
Heteronychocamptus 
Hoplolaophonte 
Indolaophonte 
Inermiphonte 
Jejulaophonte 
Klieonychocamptoides 
Klieonychocamptus 
Laophonte 
Laophontina 
Lipomelum 
Lobitella 
Maiquilaophonte 
Marbefia 
Mexicolaophonte 
Microchelonia 
Microlaophonte 
Mictyricola 
Mielkiella 
Mourephonte 
Novolaophonte 
Onychocamptus 
Onychoquinpes 
Paralaophonte 
Paronychocamptus 
Peltidiphonte 
Philippiphonte 
Pilifera 
Platychelipus 
Platylaophonte 
Pontophonte 
Propephonte 
Psammolaophonte 
Psammoplatypus 
Pseudolaophonte 
Pseudonychocamptus 
Quinquelaophonte 
Raibautius 
Raowellsia 
Raptolaophonte 
Robustunguis 
Spiniferaponte 
Stygolaophonte 
Tapholeon 
Troglophonte 
Vostoklaophonte 
Weddellaophonte 
Wellsiphontina 
Xanthilaophonte

References

Copepods